Ceryx affinis is a moth of the  subfamily Arctiinae. It was described by Rothschild in 1910. It is found in New Guinea.

References

Ceryx (moth)
Moths described in 1910